"Bleeding Me" is a song by American heavy metal band Metallica from their 1996 album, Load. It was never commercially released as a single, though a promotional CD containing the album version and an approximately two minutes shorter radio edit was distributed to radio stations in early 1997. That year, it would reach #6 on the Mainstream Rock Charts.

"Bleeding Me" is one of the few Metallica songs that contains a Hammond organ. The track has appeared from time to time in Metallica's live set since its release in 1996, including the live album S&M with the San Francisco Symphony.

Song meaning
There is some speculation as to what the song's lyrics are actually about. While there are thoughts of it being about a battle with addiction, former Metallica bassist Jason Newsted believes it is about a person being put through mental torture.

Metallica frontman James Hetfield explained what the song is about in a 2001 interview with Playboy:

In an interview shown on Kerrang! TV, Hetfield remarked on how he thought the other members of the band felt about him and his lyrics:

The inspiration from the song appears to come from a poem by Lord Byron in which he states the following:

Demo
The song's demo was an instrumental, also called "Bleeding Me". It was recorded by Hetfield and drummer Lars Ulrich in Ulrich's home musical studio "Dungeon" on April 7, 1995.

Track listing
 "Bleeding Me" (Radio Edit) – 5:57
 "Bleeding Me" – 8:18

The most notable differences in the radio edit version is the shortening of various instrumental passages and the ending of the song at the conclusion of the guitar solo.

References

External links
 

1996 songs
1997 singles
Metallica songs
Songs written by James Hetfield
Songs written by Kirk Hammett
Songs written by Lars Ulrich
Elektra Records singles
Song recordings produced by Bob Rock
American hard rock songs